Personnel and Training Command (PTC) was one of two commands of the Royal Air Force (the other being Strike Command) that were merged to form Air Command on 1 April 2007.

History

Formation 
PTC was formed in 1994 bringing together the responsibilities of the former RAF Personnel Management Centre and the training functions of RAF Support Command. It therefore became responsible for recruiting people into the service, training all members of the RAF (including initial flying training), pay and allowances, and various careers functions including terms and conditions of service, welfare, and resettlement.

Merge with Strike Command into RAF Air Command
PTC was headquartered at RAF Innsworth near Gloucester from its inauguration until October 2006, when the headquarters co-located with Strike Command at RAF High Wycombe in Buckinghamshire in preparation for the merger to form RAF Air Command on 1 April 2007.

Location
The Command's stations included Amport House, Andover, Hampshire; RAF Brampton/Wyton/Henlow, Huntingdon, Cambridgeshire; JSU Corsham, Wilts; RAF Cosford, Wolverhampton; the Royal Air Force College Cranwell, Sleaford, Lincolnshire; RAF Digby, Lincoln; RAF Halton, Aylesbury, Buckinghamshire; Headley Court, Epsom, Surrey; RAF Innsworth, Gloucester; RAF Linton-on-Ouse, York; RAF Scampton, Lincs; RAF Sealand, Deeside, Flintshire; RAF Shawbury, Shrewsbury; RAF St Athan, Barry, South Glamorgan; RAF Uxbridge, Middlesex; RAF Valley, Anglesey; and RAF Woodvale, Formby, Liverpool.

Air Officers Commanding-in-Chief
Air Officers Commanding-in-Chief included:
1 April 1994 - Air Chief Marshal Sir Andrew Wilson
1 May 1995 - Air Marshal Sir David Cousins
7 August 1998 - Air Marshal Sir Anthony Bagnall
23 March 2000 - Air Marshal Sir John Day
March 2001 - Air Marshal Sir Christopher Coville
April 2003 - Air Marshal Sir Joe French
6 January 2006 - Air Marshal Barry Thornton

See also

 List of Royal Air Force commands

References

Further reading
Royal Air Force, Personnel and Training Command website, accessed 28 May 2008

 
 

|-
 

Military units and formations disestablished in 2007
Military units and formations established in 1994
Military units and formations in Gloucestershire
Organisations based in Gloucestershire
Personnel and Training Command
Borough of Tewkesbury